The LCRL or LCR (L) (Landing Craft Rubber Large) was an inflatable boat which could carry ten men that was used by the United States Marine Corps and US Army from 1938 to 1945. 10,125 LCRLs were made during World War II.

See also
 Landing Craft Rubber Small
 Rigid-hulled inflatable boat

References

External links
 Specifications and pictures at ibiblio
 http://www.ibiblio.org/hyperwar/USN/ref/Transport/transport-8.html

Inflatable boats
Landing craft
Military boats
Inflatable manufactured goods